Big John Hamilton was an American vocalist. He is known as a singer of Southern Soul music. Hamilton lived in Florida. He made eight solo records (45s) as well as  duets with Doris Allen. They sang a version of Buddy Miles' "Them Changes" for Florida's Minaret Records label between 1967 and 1970. Sundazed Records released a Compact Disc in 2006 of his music called How Much Can a Man Take, the name of the title song from 1968.

References

American soul singers
Possibly living people
Year of birth missing